Peter V (16 September 1837 – 11 November 1861), nicknamed "the Hopeful", was King of Portugal from 1853 to 1861.

Early life and reign

As the eldest son of Queen Maria II and King Ferdinand II, Peter was a member of the House of Bragança. As heir apparent to the throne he was styled Prince Royal (Portuguese: Príncipe Real), and was also the 23rd Duke of Braganza (Duque de Bragança).

Peter was a conscientious and hard-working monarch who, under the guidance of his father, sought radical modernisation of the Portuguese state and infrastructure. Under his reign, roads, telegraphs, and railways were constructed and improvements in public health advanced. His popularity increased when, during the cholera outbreak of 1853–1856, he visited hospitals handing out gifts and comforting the sick.

Pedro V, along with his brothers Fernando and João and other royal family members, succumbed to typhoid fever or cholera in 1861.

Marriage

Peter married Princess Stephanie of Hohenzollern-Sigmaringen, eldest daughter of Karl Anton, Prince of Hohenzollern-Sigmaringen, and Princess Josephine of Baden, by proxy in Berlin on 29 April 1858 and then in person in Lisbon on 18 May 1858. It was a happy marriage until Queen Stephanie died a year later from diphtheria. As Peter and Stephanie's marriage was childless, the Portuguese throne passed to his brother Luís.

Titles, styles and honours

Titles and styles

Pedro V's official styling as King of Portugal: By the Grace of God and by the Constitution of the Monarchy, Peter V, King of Portugal and the Algarves, of either side of the sea in Africa, Lord of Guinea and of Conquest, Navigation, and Commerce of Ethiopia, South Africa, Arabia, Persia and India, etc.

As heir apparent to the Portuguese crown, Peter held the following titles:
 Duke of Braganza (23rd)
 Duke of Barcelos (18th)
 Duke of Guimarães (20th)
 Marquis of Vila Viçosa (22nd)
 Count of Ourém (24th)
 Count of Barcelos (24th)
 Count of Faria and Neiva (24th)
 Count of Arraiolos (26th)
 Count of Guimarães (21st)

Honours 
Domestic
 He was Grand Master of the following orders:
 Order of Our Lord Jesus Christ
 Order of Saint Benedict of Aviz
 Order of Saint James of the Sword
 Order of the Tower and Sword
 Order of the Immaculate Conception of Vila Viçosa

Foreign

Ancestry

See also

 Dom Pedro V Theatre
 D. Pedro V High School

References

Further reading

|-

1837 births
1861 deaths
Portuguese infantes
Princes Royal of Portugal
House of Braganza-Saxe-Coburg and Gotha
Dukes of Braganza
19th-century Portuguese monarchs
Burials at the Monastery of São Vicente de Fora
Portuguese people of German descent
People from Lisbon
Deaths from typhoid fever
Deaths from cholera
3
3
3
Knights Grand Cross of the Order of the Immaculate Conception of Vila Viçosa
Grand Crosses of the Order of Saint Stephen of Hungary
Extra Knights Companion of the Garter
Knights of the Golden Fleece of Spain
Grand Croix of the Légion d'honneur
Recipients of the Order of the Netherlands Lion
Recipients of the Order of the White Eagle (Russia)
Recipients of the Order of St. Anna, 1st class